Caulerpa longifolia, commonly known as feather caulerpa or long-filament caulerpa, is a species of seaweed in the Caulerpaceae family.

It has few upright branches that arise from a naked and coarse runner. The ends of the branches (known as ramuli) are linear or curved slightly upwards, usually occurring in five rows along the upright branches. It has a superficial similarity to Caulerpa cliftonii.

In Western Australia, it is found along the coast from Shire of Irwin in the Mid West and south as far as Rockingham it is also found in South Australia, Victoria and Tasmania.

References

longifolia
Species described in 1823